The Chadormalu Mining and Industrial Company (CMIC) (Sherkat-e Ma'dani va San'ati-ye Châdormalu) was established in June 1992 in Tehran, Iran.

CMIC is the main iron ore concentrate producer by direct reduction in the Middle East, with seven million ton per year; it produces up to 1,000,000 ton/year of crushed iron ore for blast furnaces and export.

With a market capitalization of $2 billion in 2007, CMIC is one of the largest companies listed on the Tehran Stock Exchange.

CMIC has been awarded ISO 9001, ISO 14001, and OHSAS 18001 certification.

See also
 IMIDRO -Iranian Mines & Mining Industries Development & Renovation
 Mining in Iran
 Transport in Iran

References

External links
 

Mining companies of Iran
Non-renewable resource companies established in 1992
1992 establishments in Iran
Companies listed on the Tehran Stock Exchange
Iranian entities subject to the U.S. Department of the Treasury sanctions